Corboy is a surname. Notable people with the surname include:

Edwin Corboy (1896–1950), Australian politician
Frank Corboy (1888–1948), American coach and college athletics administrator
Matt Corboy (born 1973), American actor
Michael Corboy, justice with the Supreme Court of Western Australia
Philip H. Corboy (1924–2012), American lawyer

See also
Corboy Glebe, a townland in County Cavan, Ireland